The 1978 Espirito Santo Trophy took place 10–13 October at Pacific Harbour Golf & Country Club in Navua, Viti Levu, Fiji. It was the eighth women's golf World Amateur Team Championship for the Espirito Santo Trophy. The tournament was a 72-hole stroke play team event with 14 team entries, each with three players. The best two scores for each round counted towards the team total.

The Australia team won the Trophy, winning their first title, beating team Canada by one stroke. Canada earned the silver medal and France took the bronze, five strokes further back.

Teams 
14 teams contested the event. Each team had three players.

Results 

* Notes: After scoring 74 in the first round, Sweden's Kärstin Ehrnlund withdrew due to food poisoning and Sweden had to count both scores from the other two players during the remaining three rounds. New Zealand's Heater Ryan withdrew from the last round.Sources:

Individual leaders 
There was no official recognition for the lowest individual scores.

References

External links 
World Amateur Team Championships on International Golf Federation website

Espirito Santo Trophy
Golf tournaments in Fiji
Espirito Santo Trophy
Espirito Santo Trophy
Espirito Santo Trophy